Oosterwolde may refer to:

 Oosterwolde, Friesland, a village in the municipality of Ooststellingwerf in the Dutch province of Friesland
 Oosterwolde, Gelderland, a village in the municipality of Oldebroek in the Dutch province of Gelderland